The 2008 Commonwealth of Independent States Cup was the sixteenth edition of the competition between the champions of former republics of Soviet Union. It was won by Khazar Lankaran for the first time. This was the first edition of the tournament to be hosted in Saint Petersburg, rather than in Moscow.

Participants

 1 Zenit Saint Petersburg and Dynamo Kyiv were represented by reserve players.
 2 Banants Yerevan replaced Pyunik Yerevan (2007 Armenian champions), who were not allowed to participate after 2006 semifinal incident.
 3 OFK Beograd invited by the organizing committee instead of Russian U21/U19 teams.

Group stage

Group A

Results

Group B

Results

Group C

Results

Group D

Results

Final rounds

Quarterfinals

Semifinals

Finals

Top scorers

External links
2008 CIS Cup at rsssf.com
2008 CIS Cup at football.by
2008 CIS Cup at kick-off.by

2007–08 in Ukrainian football
2008 in Russian football
2008 in Saint Petersburg
2008
January 2008 sports events in Russia